Josefine Hasbo (born 20 November 2001) is a Danish female footballer who plays as a midfielder for the Harvard Crimson in the Ivy League and has appeared for the Danish national team. She has also played for the Danish youth national teams several times.

Career
She made her international debut on the Danish national team on 7 March 2020 against Sweden, at the 2020 Algarve Cup.

International goals

Honours

Clubs
Harvard Crimson (2021–)
Ivy League
Brøndby IF (2019–2021)
 Elitedivisionen
 Winner: 2019
 Danish Cup
 Runners-up: 2019

References

External links
 
 
Profile at Danish Football Association 

2001 births
Living people
Danish women's footballers
Denmark women's international footballers
Brøndby IF (women) players
Women's association football midfielders
Association football midfielders
Ballerup-Skovlunde Fodbold (women) players
Harvard Crimson women's soccer players
Footballers from Copenhagen